Wonderful Life is an album by vocalist Irene Kral which was originally released on the Mainstream label in 1965.

Track listing
 "Wonderful Life" (David Perrin, Lester Boxer) – 1:40
 "There Are Days When I Don't Think of You at All" (Tommy Wolf, Fran Landesman) – 2:42
 "There Is No Right Way" (Wolf, Ruth Batchelor) – 2:20
 "Goin' to California" (David "Buck" Wheat, Bill Loughborough) – 2:30
 "Is It Over Baby?" (Virginia Fitting) – 2:30
 "I've Never Been Anything" (Wolf) – 2:45
 "Sometime Ago" (Sergio Mihanovic) – 3:09
 "Nothing Like You" (Bob Dorough) – 2:20
 "Here I Go Again" (Wolf, Cy Coleman) – 2:55
 "Mad at the World" (Bob Florence, Fred Manley) – 1:50
 "This Life We've Led" (Wolf, Landesman, Nelson Algren) – 3:52
 "Hold Your Head High" (Randy Newman, Jackie DeShannon) – 2:00

Personnel 
Irene Kral – vocals
Ollie Mitchell – trumpet
Joe Burnett – flugelhorn
Dick Leith – bass trombone
Gene Cipriano – tenor saxophone
Dennis Budimir, Ervan Coleman, Mike Deasy, Don Peake – guitar
Al De Lory, Russ Freeman – piano
Chuck Berghofer, Jimmy Bond – bass
Hal Blaine – drums
 Gene Estes, Emil Richards – percussion
Jesse Ehrlich, Anne Goodman, Joseph Sexon – cello

References 

1965 albums
Irene Kral albums
Mainstream Records albums